Braccagni is a village in Tuscany, administratively a frazione of the comune of Grosseto.

It is positioned in the northern part of the municipal territory, at the bottom of the hill of Montepescali.

History
The village of Braccagni was founded in 1846 as an appendix of the frazione of Montepescali, but it increased as a nodal point of the economy of the area after the opening of its own station along the Tirrenica railway line in 1864.

Main sights
 San Guglielmo d'Aquitania, main parish church in Braccagni, it was designed by engineer Ernesto Ganelli in 1940.
 Fattoria degli Aquisti with the chapel of Sant'Umberto

Events
Fiera del Madonnino, yearly Grosseto trade fair (40th edition in 2018)
Festival del Maggio, held every first of May

See also
Alberese
Batignano
Istia d'Ombrone
Marina di Grosseto
Montepescali
Principina a Mare
Principina Terra
Rispescia
Roselle, Italy

References

Bibliography

External links

Frazioni of Grosseto
Railway towns in Italy